Charles Johnson (March 31, 1949 – June 1, 2007) was an American professional basketball player for the Golden State Warriors and the Washington Bullets of the National Basketball Association (NBA). He was an alumnus of Sequoia High School and then scored 1,000 points in three years at the University of California, Berkeley.

The San Francisco Warriors drafted Johnson in the 6th round of the 1971 NBA draft. The 6-foot-0, 170-pound point guard played with the Warriors for five seasons and part of a sixth until he was waived in early January 1978.  Johnson was a member of the 1974–75 Warriors NBA championship team.

After his release, Johnson was signed by the Washington Bullets in January, 1978, after a season-ending injury to Phil Chenier. Johnson averaged 8.3 points, 2.4 rebounds and 2.1 assists as a member of the 1977–78 NBA Championship.

Elvin Hayes attributed the Bullets championship run to the acquisition of Johnson. In the last four games of the 1978 NBA finals against the Seattle SuperSonics, Johnson scored 80 points and helped Washington win the series 4 games to 3. The Bullets topped the Atlanta Hawks, San Antonio Spurs and Philadelphia 76ers to reach the championship round.

Johnson died of cancer on June 1, 2007, aged 58.

References

External links
NBA stats @ basketballreference.com

 

1949 births
2007 deaths
African-American basketball players
American men's basketball players
Basketball players from California
Basketball players from Texas
California Golden Bears men's basketball players
Deaths from cancer in California
Golden State Warriors draft picks
Golden State Warriors players
Point guards
Sportspeople from Corpus Christi, Texas
Washington Bullets players
20th-century African-American sportspeople
21st-century African-American people